Sebastian Gabriel Chitoșcă (born 2 October 1992) is a retired Romanian professional footballer who played as a left or right midfielder.

International career
Chitoșcă was selected Romania's squad for the 2011 UEFA European Under-19 Football Championship, which took place in his native country. He made his debut for the team in the same tournament on 20 July 2011 in a game against Greece.

Career statistics

Statistics accurate as of match played 29 May 2017

References

External links

1992 births
Living people
Sportspeople from Piatra Neamț
Romanian footballers
Romania youth international footballers
Association football midfielders
Liga I players
Liga II players
CSM Ceahlăul Piatra Neamț players
FC Steaua București players
FC Voluntari players
FC Brașov (1936) players
FC Botoșani players
FC Universitatea Cluj players